Psi-ence Fiction is a BBC Books original novel written by Chris Boucher and based on the long-running British science fiction television series Doctor Who. It features the Fourth Doctor and Leela.

Plot synopsis
The University of East Wessex has an up and running parapsychology department. Various experiments are being run by the students. Unfortunately someone has stumbled upon something big. Big enough to threaten all of reality.

References

External links

2001 British novels
2001 science fiction novels
Past Doctor Adventures
Fourth Doctor novels
Novels by Chris Boucher